Bistrica is a village in the municipality of Banja Luka, Republika Srpska, Bosnia and Herzegovina.

Demographics
Ethnic groups in the village include:
1,363 Serbs (98.34%)
23 Others (1.66%)

References

Villages in Republika Srpska
Populated places in Banja Luka